Haploesthes robusta is a Mexican species of flowering plants in the family Asteraceae. It has been found only in the state of Coahuila in northern Mexico.

The genus name is sometimes spelled Haploësthes, with two dots over the first e to indicate that the o and the e are to be pronounced in separate syllables. This is optional; either spelling is equally acceptable.

Haploesthes robusta grows along stream banks in areas with gypsum soil. Leaves are triangular in cross-section.

References

Tageteae
Flora of Coahuila
Endemic flora of Mexico
Plants described in 1941